Vito is an Italian name that is derived from the Latin word "vita", meaning "life". 
It is a modern form of the Latin name Vitus, meaning "life-giver,"  as in San Vito or Saint Vitus, the patron saint of dogs and a heroic figure in southern Italian folklore.

There is also a Slavic name "Vitomir" that is shortened to "Vito", but has a different etymology.

The name "Vito" is sometimes confused with the German name "Wido," which is derived from Ancient Germanic.

People
People with this name include:
 San Vito dei Normanni, Saint Vito Protector of the Normans at sea, since medieval times 
 Vito F. Cinfio, Italian-American Structural Engineer
 Vito R. Bertoldo, American Medal of Honor recipient
 Vito Dimitrijević, a Yugoslavian former professional footballer
 Vito Dumas, Argentine sailor and travel-writer, who sailed solo around the world
 Vito Fossella, American politician from New York
 Vito Genovese, Italian-American mob boss
 Vito LoGrasso, American professional wrestler
 Vito Mannone, Italian footballer
 Vincent "Don Vito" Margera, actor and TV personality
 Vito Nikolić, Montenegrin poet
 Vito Positano, Italian diplomat
 Vito Postiglione, Italian auto racing driver
 Vito Rizzuto (1946–2013), Canadian mobster
 Vito Russo, American activist
 Vito Schlickmann (1928-2023), Brazilian Roman Catholic prelate
 Vito Scotti (1918-1996), American director
 Vito Thomaselli, former professional wrestler and podcast personality
 Victor Vito (rugby player), New Zealand rugby union and rugby sevens player
 Vitellia gens, ancient Roman family
 Vito Blandi, American Football Hall of Famer

Fictional characters
 Vito Corleone, titular character of the novel The Godfather
 Vito O'Malley, supporting character in the video game series Delicious
 Vito Napoli, namesake of Vito O'Malley and minor character in the Delicious series
 Vito Spatafore, The Sopranos character
 Vito Scaletta, the protagonist of the game Mafia II and one of the main characters of Mafia III
 Angela Vito, the antagonist from the Korean novel & manhwa Angelic Lady
 VITO, Very Important Top Officer, a way to describe a key decision maker at a large organization

See also

References

Italian masculine given names